Zero day may refer to:

 Zero Day (album), by MC Frontalot
 Zero Day (novel), a 2011 thriller novel by David Baldacci
 Zero Day (2003 film), an American film by Ben Coccio
Zero Day (2020 film), an Iranian action thriller drama film
 Zero-day (computing), a software exploit that is unpatched by the vendor; also known as '0-day'
 Zero-day warez, copyrighted software that is cracked on the same day it is released
 Zero Days, a 2016 documentary film
 Zero Days (album), an album by Prong
 Day Zero, Cape Town water crisis
 Zero-day (military terminology), synonym of D-Day (military term)

See also 
 Zero Hour (disambiguation)